In the mathematical theory of elasticity, Saint-Venant's compatibility condition defines the relationship between the strain  and a displacement field  by

where . Barré de Saint-Venant derived the compatibility condition for  an arbitrary symmetric second rank tensor field to be of this form, this has now been generalized to higher rank symmetric tensor fields on spaces of dimension

Rank 2 tensor fields
For a symmetric rank 2 tensor field  in n-dimensional Euclidean space the integrability condition takes the form of the vanishing of the Saint-Venant's tensor   defined by 

The result that, on a simply connected domain W=0 implies that strain is the symmetric derivative of some vector field, was first described by Barré de Saint-Venant in 1864 and proved rigorously by Beltrami in 1886. For non-simply connected domains there are finite dimensional spaces of symmetric tensors with vanishing Saint-Venant's tensor that are not the symmetric derivative of a vector field. The situation is analogous to de Rham cohomology

The Saint-Venant tensor  is closely related to the Riemann curvature tensor . Indeed the first variation  about the Euclidean metric with a perturbation in the metric  is precisely .

In its simplest form of course the components of  must be assumed twice continuously differentiable, but more recent work proves the result in a much more general case.

The relation between Saint-Venant's compatibility condition and Poincaré's lemma can be understood more clearly using a reduced form of  the Kröner tensor 

where  is the permutation symbol. For , is a symmetric rank 2 tensor field. While this still involves two derivatives rather than the one in the Poincaré lemma, it is possible to reduce to a problem involving first derivatives by introducing more variables and it has been shown that the resulting 'elasticity complex' is equivalent to the de Rham complex.

In differential geometry the symmetrized derivative of a vector field appears also as the Lie derivative of the metric tensor g with respect to the vector field.

where indices following a semicolon indicate covariant differentiation. As noted above this coincides with the vanishing of the linearization of the Riemann curvature tensor about the Euclidean metric.

Generalization to higher rank tensors

Saint-Venant's compatibility condition can be thought of as an analogue, for symmetric tensor fields, of Poincaré's lemma for skew-symmetric tensor fields (differential forms). The result can be generalized to higher rank symmetric tensor fields. Let F be a symmetric rank-k tensor field on an open set in n-dimensional Euclidean space, then the symmetric derivative is the rank k+1 tensor field defined by

where we use the classical notation that indices following a comma indicate differentiation and groups of indices enclosed in brackets indicate symmetrization over those indices. The Saint-Venant tensor  of a  symmetric rank-k tensor field  is defined by

with

On a simply connected domain in Euclidean space  implies that  for some rank k-1 symmetric tensor field .

References

See also 
 Compatibility (mechanics)

Elasticity (physics)
Tensors
Partial differential equations